Shahrak-e Golestan Emam Khomeyni (also Romanized as Shahraḵ-e Golestān Emām Khomeynī) is a village in Aqabad Rural District, in the Central District of Gonbad-e Qabus County, Golestan Province, Iran. At the 2006 census, its population was 188, in 41 families.

References 

Populated places in Gonbad-e Kavus County